The 2018 Southern Conference baseball tournament was held from May 22 through 27 at Fluor Field at the West End in Greenville, South Carolina.  The annual event determines the conference champion of the Southern Conference (SoCon) in NCAA Division I college baseball.   won their second tournament championship and earned the league's bid to the 2018 NCAA Division I baseball tournament.  This was the last of 20 athletic championships held by the conference in the 2017–18 academic year.

The tournament was originally held from 1950-53, when the SoCon was a large conference composed of several small schools and several large schools, the latter of which would form the Atlantic Coast Conference after the 1953 season. The event was re-established in 1984 and has been held every year since.  Defending champion Western Carolina has claimed ten championships, the most of any school, with The Citadel close behind at eight tournament wins.  Furman is the only other school current school with multiple championships, having won two. East Tennessee State and VMI have never won a title, although they both returned to the conference in 2015 after over ten years in other conferences. Mercer claimed the conference championship in its first ever appearance in 2015.

The tournament was played in Greenville, which had hosted five of the previous nine events.

Seeding and format
All nine teams participated in the tournament, with the bottom two seeds playing a single-elimination play-in round.  The remaining teams were then divided into two brackets and played double-elimination tournaments.

Bracket

Play-In Round

Double-elimination round

References

Tournament
Southern Conference Baseball Tournament
SoCon baseball tournament
Southern Conference baseball tournament
Baseball competitions in Greenville, South Carolina
College baseball tournaments in South Carolina